This is a list of Ministers of Foreign Affairs of the Republic of Cyprus since the independence in 1960:

See also 

 Ministry of Foreign Affairs (Cyprus)

External links 
 List of Ministers of Foreign Affairs of Cyprus 

Foreign Affairs
 
Cyprus

tr:Kıbrıs Cumhuriyeti Dışişleri Bakanlığı#Bakanlar
el:Κατάλογος Υπουργών Εξωτερικών της Κύπρου